Liberato is a personal name and surname, being a Portuguese, Spanish and Italian variant of the Latin name Liberatus, that means free man, referring to a slave who was freed, described as “the one who gets freedom”.

Surname
Gugu Liberato (1959–2019), Brazilian television presenter, entrepreneur, actor and singer
Jorge Liberato Urosa Savino (1942), Venezuelan cardinal
Ingra Lyberato (1966), Brazilian actress
Liana Liberato (1995), American actress
Luciano de Liberato (1947), Italian painter
Luis Liberato (1995), Dominican baseball player
Roberto Liberato (1965), Swiss sprinter canoer

Name
Liberato (d. 269 AD), Christian martyr from Italy
Liberato Cacace (2000), New Zealand professional footballer
Liberato Marcial Rojas (1870—1922), Paraguayan president
Liberato Pinto (1880—1949), Portuguese Lieutenant Colonel

References

Portuguese-language surnames
Spanish-language surnames
Italian-language surnames
Portuguese masculine given names
Spanish masculine given names
Italian masculine given names